Anu Muhammad Anisur Rahman, better known as Anu Muhammad (born 1956), is a Bangladeshi economist, public intellectual, writer, editor, and political activist. He is the member-secretary of the National Committee to Protect Oil, Gas, Mineral Resources, Power and Ports.

Career 
Anu Muhammad is a professor at Jahangirnagar University where he has been teaching economics since 1982 and taught anthropology from 1991 to 2005. He was a visiting professor at the University of Winnipeg and the University of Manitoba in 2001 and worked at Columbia University as a visiting scholar in 1993. His research and written work focus on such areas as current economic and political problems in Bangladesh, political economy, globalisation, social transformation, gender issues, non-governmental organisations, environment, and energy. He is the member-secretary of the citizen's movement platform called National Committee to Protect Oil-Gas-Mineral Resources-Power and Ports.

Political views 
Anu is involved in a variety of movements in Bangladesh and his appearance on TV talk shows with his anti-establishment position led to a death threat he received in February 2008. He was injured by the police in September 2009 during a demonstration protesting exploration deals granted by the government to two international oil companies. This event led to a protest by the Bangladesh Economic Association and to an open letter condemning the event, signed as it was by intellectuals, academics, and activists from around the world, including, among many others, Bertell Ollman, E. San Juan, Jr., Vijay Prashad, Gopal Balakrishnan, Nurul Kabir, and by Azfar Hussain, who convened this international signature campaign.

Works 
Anu Muhammad has written more than 30 books, most of them in Bangla and some in English. He is the editor of the quarterly journal Sarbajonakotha.

His books include:

 1983. Biswa Pujibad O Bangladesher Anunnayan (World Capitalism and Underdevelopment of Bangladesh), Karim Prakashani, Dhaka.
 1985, 2000. Bangladesher Grameen Samaj O Arthaniti (Rural Society and Economy of Bangladesh), Dripta Prakashani, Meera Prakashani, Dhaka.
 1988, 1999. Bangladeshi Unnayan Shankat ebang NGO Model (Crisis of Development and the NGO Model in Bangladesh), Prachinta Prakashani, Dhaka.
 1989. Bangladesher Kotipati,Madhyabitto O Sramik (Multimillionaires,Middle Class and Workers), Chalantika Baighar, Dhaka.
 1990. Anunnata Deshe Samajtanra: Sangram O Aviggata ( Socialism in Underdeveloped Countries: Struggle and Experience), Pratik Prakashani, Dhaka.1991, Sanghati, 2019.
 2002. Krantikaler Biswa-arthaniti ebang Unnoyan Samrajya ( World Economy in transition and Development Empire), Bastu Prakashani, Meera Prakashani, Dhaka.
 1992. Samaj, Samay ebong Manusher Larai (Society, Time and Struggle of Human-being), Shandesh, Dhaka.
 1993. 2006. Punjir Antarjatikikaran ebong Anunnata Biswa ( Internationalization of Capital and Underdeveloped World), Center for Social Studies, Dhaka University. (Sraban in 2006).
 1994. Dharma, Rashtra ebong Gonotantrik Andolon (Religion, State and Democratic Struggle), Charbak, Dhaka. 
 1995. Columbuser America "Abishkar" O Bahujatik Manushera (Columbus's "Discovery" of America and Multinational faces ), Jatiyo Grantha Prakashan, Dhaka.
 1995. Bangladesher Unnoyan ki Asamvab?( Is Development of Bangladesh impossible?), Jatiyo Grantha Prakashan, Dhaka.
 1997. Nari,Purush O Samaj (Gender and Society), Shandesh, Dhaka. Sanghati, 2005
 2000. Rashtra O Rajniti: Bangladesher Dui Doshok (State and Politics: Two decades of Bangladesh), Sandesh, Dhaka.
 2000. Bangladesher Arthinitir Chalchitra (Scanning Bangladesh Economy), Sraban, Dhaka.
 2001. Atonker Somaj Sontraser Arthiniti (Society of Fear Economy of Violence), Mira Prokashan, Dhaka. 
 2001. Arthasastrer Mulniti (Principles of Economics), Bangladesh Open University, Dhaka.
 2002. Bangladesher Tel-Gas: Kar Ssompod Kar Bipod (Oil and Gas in Bangladesh: Whose Resource Whose Liability), Jatiyo Grantha Prakashan, Dhaka.
 2003. 2011. Biswaner Boiporitya (Contrariety of Globalization). Sraban, Dhaka.
 2005. Bangladesher Arthinir Gotimukh (Direction Of Bangladesh Economy), Sraban, Dhaka.
 2006. Unnoyoner Rajniti(Politics of Development), Shuchipatra, Dhaka.
 2007. 2011. Biplober Swapnabhumi Cuba pujibadi Biswayane Latin America (Cuba the dreamland of Revolution and Latin America in Globalized Capitalism), Sraban, Dhaka 
 2007. Phulbari Kansat Garments 2006, Sraban, Dhaka 
 2007. 2011. Development or Destruction, Essays on Global Hegemony, Corporate Grabbing and Bangladesh, Sraban, Dhaka
 2008. Kothai Jachche Bangladesh, (Where Bangladesh is heading to) Sanghati.
 2009. Arokkhito Desh Arokkhito Manush, (Unprotected country unprotected people) Adorn.
 2010. Arthastra Porichoi (Introduction to Economics), Sanghati
 2011. Pujir antorgoto probonota,(Inherent trends and crisis of Capital)  Sanghati
 2014. Issor, punji o manush, (God, Capital and People), Mowla, Dhaka. 
 2015. Amra 99% (We are 99%), Manushjon, Dhaka. 
 2016. sontras birodhi juddha (War on Terror): Afghanistan, Iraq, Bangladesh, Aloghar, Dhaka.
 2018. Unnoyoner Boiporityo (Contrariety of Development), Mowla Brothers, Dhaka. 
 2019. Pran Prakriti Bangladesh (Life nature Bangladesh), Mowla Brothers, Dhaka.
 2019. Rashtra ache Rashtra nai (State exists, State does not exist), sanghati, Dhaka.

References

External links 
 
 Development Strategy and Problems of Democratisation in a Peripheral Country, Radical Notes, 9 January 2007
 Peripheral Economy, Global Capital and Movements in Bangladesh: An

Bangladeshi Marxists
1956 births
Living people
Academic staff of Jahangirnagar University